Kevin Senio (born July 6, 1978) is a former New Zealand rugby union professional who most recently played professionally for ASM Clermont Auvergne. He is currently the head coach of Ponsonby Rugby club, based in Auckland, New Zealand. Senio is also a former All Black, making his debut after coming on for Piri Weepu against Australia in New Zealand's 34–24 win in the final match of the 2005 Tri Nations Series and is currently a Junior All Black. That is Senio's only test thus far into his career. During his time at Bay of Plenty, Senio played in a tour match against the British & Irish Lions and was later called into the Junior All Blacks tour of Australia against Australia A.

Senio signed a two-year deal with the Canterbury Rugby Football Union (CRFU) on 26 September 2005, making him eligible to play for the Crusaders, after former Canterbury and Crusaders half-back, Justin Marshall, left to play in England following the 2005 British & Irish Lions tour to New Zealand. Senio also left after playing second fiddle to starting Chiefs' half-back, Byron Kelleher, who is also an All Black.

After being the starting scrum-half for the first part of the season, Senio found himself battling it out for regular game time with rookie Andy Ellis. However, Ellis was injured in the semi-final against the Bulls and Senio started the 2006 Super 14 Final against the Hurricanes. The day after the final, Senio was selected for the Junior All Blacks to play in the inaugural Pacific Five Nations tournament.

Senio has also represented NZ at age grade level, NZ Schools u/19 and u/21 and has also represented the NZ 7's team. Senio is married to Silver Fern Anna Senio and is brother to CS Bourgoin-Jallieu scrum-half John Senio. Senio is also the brother of Dimitri Senio, who plays rugby union in France for SC Albi.

References
Injury throws new Blue into the hot seat
Senio set for Crusaders debut
Canterbury accused of greed over Senio signing

1978 births
Bay of Plenty rugby union players
Canterbury rugby union players
Crusaders (rugby union) players
Expatriate rugby union players in France
People educated at Liston College
Living people
New Zealand international rugby union players
New Zealand rugby union players
Rugby union scrum-halves
New Zealand expatriate rugby union players
New Zealand expatriate sportspeople in France
Samoa international rugby sevens players
Male rugby sevens players